Pierre Djaka Njanka-Beyaka (born 15 March 1975) is a Cameroonian former professional football defender. Njanka played for Cameroon at the 1998 and 2002 World Cups, as well as the 2004 African Nations Cup. He has been capped 47 times for his country. He scored a goal against Austria in World Cup 1998, for which the commentator said he "tore through the heart of the Austrian defence", before placing the ball in the top corner of the net.

Njanka previously played for RC Strasbourg, CS Sedan and FC Istres in the French Ligue 1 and Ligue 2. Whilst at Strasbourg Njanka played in the 2001 Coupe de France Final in which they beat Amiens SC on penalties. He had a trial with English Premier League side Sunderland in July 2000 playing in a pre-season match between Sunderland and KV Mechelen. He was also set to join Portsmouth in 2001 but a knee injury ended the move prematurely.

Honours

Strasbourg
Coupe de France: 2000–01

Arema Indonesia
Indonesia Super League: 2009–10

Cameroon
Africa Cup of Nations: 2000

References

External links
 

1975 births
Living people
Association football defenders
Cameroonian footballers
Cameroon international footballers
Neuchâtel Xamax FCS players
RC Strasbourg Alsace players
CS Sedan Ardennes players
FC Istres players
Stade Tunisien players
Club Africain players
Al-Wehda Club (Mecca) players
1998 FIFA World Cup players
2000 African Cup of Nations players
2001 FIFA Confederations Cup players
2002 FIFA World Cup players
2003 FIFA Confederations Cup players
2004 African Cup of Nations players
Cameroonian expatriate sportspeople in Tunisia
Cameroonian expatriate footballers
Expatriate footballers in Switzerland
Expatriate footballers in France
Expatriate footballers in Tunisia
Expatriate footballers in Saudi Arabia
Expatriate footballers in Indonesia
Swiss Super League players
Ligue 1 players
Ligue 2 players
Liga 1 (Indonesia) players
Indonesian Super League-winning players
Saudi Professional League players
Arema F.C. players
Persija Jakarta players
Mitra Kukar players
Persisam Putra Samarinda players
Cameroonian expatriate sportspeople in Switzerland
Cameroonian expatriate sportspeople in France
Cameroonian expatriate sportspeople in Saudi Arabia
Cameroonian expatriate sportspeople in Indonesia